Veterans Memorial High School is a public high school in south Corpus Christi, Texas, United States, northwest of Oso Bay. It is operated by the Corpus Christi Independent School District and is classified as a 5A school by the UIL. Veterans High opened in August 2015 and graduated its first senior class in June 2017.  The school was built on 95 acres at a cost of $93.2 million, funded by a 2010 bond issue. It was originally intended to replace Mary Carroll High School but increased growth projections led the District to decide to keep both schools open.  It was the district's first new high school in 45 years. In 2017, the school was rated "Met Standard" by the Texas Education Agency.

References

External links
Official website
Veterans Memorial High School at The Texas Tribune

Corpus Christi Independent School District high schools
2015 establishments in Texas